Wickersham is a surname of Irish origin, specifically originating in County Cork and County Kerry. Notable people with the surname include:

Cornelius Wendell Wickersham, Brigadier General in the United States Army, philatelic writer, winner of the  Lichtenstein Medal in 1959
Dave Wickersham,  former Major League Baseball pitcher
Emily Wickersham, U.S. actress
George W. Wickersham, 48th U.S. Attorney General
J. Hunter Wickersham, recipient of the Medal of Honor during World War I
James Wickersham, former Alaskan district judge
Jeff Wickersham, former LSU quarterback
Jonny Wickersham, guitarist for The Cadillac Tramps, Youth Brigade, U.S. Bombs, and Social Distortion
Liz Wickersham, host of CNN's entertainment newsmagazine Showbiz Today
Seth Wickersham, American sports writer
Victor Wickersham, former U.S. Representative from Oklahoma

See also
Wickersham Commission (1929), investigated prohibition and its policing
Operation Wickersham, a series of operations during the Iraq War
MV Wickersham, a mainline ferry vessel for the Alaska Marine Highway

References